Benjamin Leo Knight (born 14 June 2002) is an English footballer who plays as a forward for Premier League side Manchester City.

Club career

Early career
Born in Cambridge, Knight started his career with local side Burwell Tigers, joining at under-7s level, before joining Ipswich Town. After eight years with Ipswich Town, Knight joined Premier League side Manchester City in July 2018.

Manchester City
Knight made his Manchester City debut as a 74th minute substitute, replacing Ferran Torres, in the 2021 FA Community Shield at Wembley Stadium on 7 August 2021.

Crewe Alexandra (loan)
On 16 August 2021, Knight joined Crewe Alexandra on a season-long loan, and made his Crewe debut the following day in a 1–0 defeat at Oxford United. He scored his first Crewe goal on his fifth appearance, the winner in a 1–0 victory at Shrewsbury Town in an EFL Trophy group tie on 31 August 2021, but then picked up an injury that ruled him out until 30 October 2021. He played five further games, scoring once, before being sidelined again with a foot injury.

Personal life
Knight is the nephew of former England international cricketer Nick Knight.

Career statistics

Notes

References

External links

2002 births
Living people
Sportspeople from Cambridge
Association football forwards
English footballers
England youth international footballers
Ipswich Town F.C. players
Manchester City F.C. players